Žinkovy is a market town in Plzeň-South District in the Plzeň Region of the Czech Republic. It has about 800 inhabitants.

Administrative parts
Villages of Březí, Čepinec and Kokořov are administrative parts of Žinkovy.

Notable people
Johann Baptist Bohadsch (1724–1768), German botanist and pharmacist

References

External links

Populated places in Plzeň-South District
Market towns in the Czech Republic